Woodstock Park may refer to:

Woodstock Park F.C., the former name of Sittingbourne Community F.C., an English football club
Woodstock Park (Portland, Oregon), the public park located in Portland, Oregon